Malta competed at the 1996 Summer Olympics in Atlanta, United States. Malta took part in athletics, judo, sailing, shooting and swimming.

Results by event

Athletics
Men's 100 metres
 Mario Bonello — 88th place

Women's Marathon
 Carol Galea — did not finish (→ no ranking)

Judo
Women's Competition
 Laurie Pace — lost her two fights

Sailing
Men's Board Sailing
 Andrew Wilson — best placing was 27th and finished 38th out of 46

Men's Laser
 John Tabone — at one time 24th place, but finished 41st out of 56 competitors

Shooting
Men's Competition
 Frans Pace — 20th out of 52

Swimming
Women's 50m Freestyle
 Gail Rizzo — 4th in heat, 50th out of 55

Women's 100m Freestyle
 Gail Rizzo — last place

Women's 100m Backstroke
 Gail Rizzo — 2nd in her heat and 33rd out of 36

References
Official Olympic Reports

Nations at the 1996 Summer Olympics
1996 Summer Olympics
Summer Olympics